Rocky Butte (previously known as Mowich Illahee and Wiberg Butte) is an extinct cinder cone butte in Portland, Oregon, United States. It is also part of the Boring Lava Field, a group of volcanic vents and lava flows throughout Oregon and Washington state. The volcano erupted between 285,000 and 500,000 years ago.

As part of the Boring Lava Field, Rocky Butte is considered an outlier of the Cascade Range. It was produced by the subduction of the oceanic Juan de Fuca tectonic plate under the North American tectonic plate; it is the core remnant of intrusive rock from kilate Pleistocene volcano. The Butte has a calc-alkaline composition and consists of basaltic andesite with olivine phenocrysts.

Historically, the mountain was the home of the Rocky Butte Jail, Judson Baptist College, and Hill Military Academy, as well as an extensive Works Progress Administration construction project; it is also the site of a still functioning but decommissioned airway beacon, Portland Bible College, and a campus for the City Bible Church. The slopes of Rocky Butte currently support Joseph Wood Hill Park and the Rocky Butte Natural Area, which includes a wide variety of flora and fauna and supports rich forest stands. Located next to Interstate 205, the Butte is a popular destination for hiking, climbing, and seeing mountains from its summit viewpoint.

Geography 

Rocky Butte lies in the northeast part of Portland within the city limits, in Multnomah County, part of the U. S. state of Oregon. It is one of the few smaller volcanic cones within or near Portland, along with Mount Tabor, Kelly Butte, and Powell Butte. It is surrounded on almost all sides by the Portland Delta.

The Columbia River flows west from the eastern Portland region, merging with the Willamette near Portland before moving north. Tributaries for the Willamette include the Pudding, Molalla, Tualatin, Abernethy, and Clackamas Rivers, while the Washougal and Sandy Rivers mark notable tributaries for the Columbia River. The Columbia River has significantly shaped the geology of the area.

Portland's climate is moderate, with long growing seasons, moderate rainfail, mild winters, and warm, dry summer seasons. The area typically does not experience frost, with more than 200 frost-free days annually. Prevailing winds originate from the south during winter and from the northwest during the summer season, with the exception of prevailing winds at the mouth of the Columbia River Gorge, where winds predominantly move to the east. The southern winds have the highest velocities of the three, only rarely occurring with potentially destructive force.

Geology 

There are a number of volcanic centers within a  radius of Troutdale and more than 32 vents within a  radius of Kelly Butte. Mostly small cinder cone vents, these volcanoes also include some larger lava domes from shield volcanoes at Mount Sylvania, Highland Butte, and Larch Mountain. Known as the Boring Lava Field, this cluster includes more than 80 known small vents and associated lava flows, with more volcanic deposits likely present. The Global Volcanism Program reports that the field includes somewhere between 32 and 50 shield volcanoes and cinder cones, with many vents concentrated northwest of the town of Boring.

It marks one of five volcanic fields along the Quaternary Cascade arc, along with Indian Heaven, Tumalo in Oregon, the Mount Bachelor chain, and Caribou in California. Like the Cascade Range, the Boring field was also generated by the subduction of the oceanic Juan de Fuca tectonic plate under the North American tectonic plate, but it has a different tectonic position, with its eruptive activity more likely related to tectonic rifting throughout the region.

Volcanic vents with either extensive eruptions of lava flows or volcanic plugs that filled their vents survived, including Rocky Butte, Prune Hill, and Beacon Rock. However, the upstream side of Rocky Butte was heavily eroded by the flooding.

Rocky Butte is a prominent, but isolated hill, with two volcanic vents. It is the core remnant of intrusive rock from a heavily eroded, late Pleistocene volcano that erupted basaltic andesite. Like many other vents in the Boring Lava Field, Rocky Butte consists of basaltic andesite with olivine phenocrysts, and it has a calc-alkalic composition. This basaltic andesite can be observed in exposures that extend from its summit park area to the roads below, as well as in a sill (a sheet of intrusive rock wedged between older layers of sedimentary rock, beds of volcanic lava, or tuff, or along the direction of layering in metamorphic rock) between layers of fluvial gravel from the Troutdale Formation on the Butte's eastern slope, within a flow scarp. Vug cavities were identified from rock in the historic quarry on the eastern side of Rocky Butte by scientists from the United States Geological Survey, including optically positive hornblende (also known as pargasite) with a pale brown color. They exhibit prismatic cleavage and extend for a few millimeters in length. Other minerals identified were dark green, pyroxene crystals with 70 percent hedenbergite and 30 percent diopside; white aggregates of tridymite; brown, granular olivine crystals with 80 percent forsterite and 20 percent fayalite; and tiny black, hexagonal plates of hematite with beveled edges. These minerals constitute a rare combination, and Trimble (1963) was unable to explain why free silica tridymite would be found together with low silica olivine.

The hill descends to meet the floodplain of the Columbia River, and at lower elevations, the mountain has cliffs on its northern and eastern sides. At the foot of Rocky Butte, there is a fosse (a ditch), which extends for  before it opens toward the Columbia River to the north and divides to the south into two arms that run west and southwest. These features are likely the product of more than just erosional forces; Bretz (1925) argued that the fosse resulted from fluid eddies that pushed downward where currents interacted with the eastern side of Rocky Butte, and the terrace formed from accumulation of deposits in water under the blockage.

Eruptive history 

Evarts et al. (2009) assign Rocky Butte an age younger than 500,000 years. One Argon–argon dating experiment determined an age for Rocky Butte lava of 285,000 years ± 16,000 years ago, which matches the normal magnetic polarity for the lava deposits at the Butte. Local newspaper sources report that Rocky Butte is extinct.

The exposure of rock from the Troutdale Formation suggests that Rocky Butte erupted onto a topographically irregular surface and that this surface later underwent erosion.

Ecology 
The moderate climate and ample precipitation of the region lead to rapid regrowth of vegetation on untended sites, which can hamper fieldwork in the area. Many forests that covered the area were partly cleared for agriculture, timber, or burials in the early 20th century. These cleared and burned land plots sustain rich stands of secondary forest, featuring gorse, huckleberry, nettles, poison oak, salal, and blackberry. Myriad species of fern, as well as rapid-growth deciduous trees like alder and vine maple are also frequent. Forests support stands of Douglas fir, western hemlock, western redcedar, Pacific dogwood, bigleaf maple, Oregon ash, red alder, cascara buckthorn, Pacific madrone, and Oregon white oak; within swamps and moist areas in creeks, the shrub Devil's club can be observed. Other trees that sometimes dominate forest areas include black cottonwood. Forest communities have many additional shrubs including Indian plum, western hazel, and snowberry. Ground layer plants include the herbaceous sword fern and stinging nettle.

In contemporary times, clearing of forests for housing development has left about half of the Boring Lava region still forested. As a result, water quality has decreased due to higher sedimentation and turbidity, and flooding has gotten worse over time. Streams within the area are of either first or second order, with moderate to low flows and average gradients between 10 and 12 percent. Cool and clear, many sustain macroinvertebrates, and a smaller number support amphibians and fish. The Riparian zones in the Lava Field area host diverse species, and they are influenced by uplands that serve as migration connections for birds, mammals, reptiles, and some amphibians. Gravel bars extend to the west from Rocky Butte, creating barriers for a lowland marsh.

The United States Fish and Wildlife Service provided a list of potentially threatened or endangered species in the Boring Lava area, calling them "sensitive" species. Among plant species, they determined the following species to be sensitive: white top aster, golden Indian paintbrush, tall bugbane, pale larkspur, peacock larkspur, Willamette daisy, water howellia, Bradshaw's lomatium, Kincaid's lupine, Howell's montia, Nelson's checkermallow, and Oregon sullivantia. For animal and marine life, northwestern pond turtles, Willow flycatchers, long-eared myotises, fringed myotises, long-legged myotises, Yuma myotises, Pacific western big-eared bats, and northern red-legged frogs have been identified as species of concern; pileated woodpeckers, bald eagles, cutthroat trout, and coho salmon are also considered sensitive.

Human history 

Mowitch Illihee, 'home of the deer', was the traditional hunting grounds for indigenous peoples.

At the summit of Rocky Butte, a rotating airway beacon was erected in 1929; though the beacon is still lit, it was officially decommissioned in the late 1960s.
Called Joseph Wood Hill Park, it was built on Rocky Butte when Rocky Butte was known as Wiberg Butte. Rock from Rocky Butte's eastern slopes was used for the Multnomah County jail building, and some were later used for renovation of the Historic Columbia River Highway. There is a communications tower on the southern end of the volcano.

The Rocky Butte jail, completed in 1947, served as the major facility for male prisoners in Multnomah County, with a courtyard and recreation field. According to Rubin (1973), the Rocky Butte jail housed 320 inmates, but Houston, Gibbons, and Jones (1988) claimed that it often exceeded this limit. The jail also had a library, which was established in 1967 and housed 3,000 volumes. In general, the jail was known for being the subject of multiple grand jury investigations for security concerns, dirty conditions, access to drugs, violence, lack of organized programming, and most notably, during the 1960s and 1970s for severe overcrowding. Further attempts to replace the Rocky Butte jail were motivated by a successful escape in 1981 and a gun smuggling incident that resulted in an officer being shot in 1982. The Multnomah County Detention Center (MCDC) was built in downtown Portland after Rocky Butte Jail was demolished in 1984 to make way for Interstate 205. The Rocky Butte Jail and MCDC participated in a study on prisons, which was published in 1988 in the journal Crime & Delinquency.

In 1934, the Rocky Butte Scenic Drive Historic District was established. Built as part of a Works Progress Administration project that supported 25,000 employees in Portland, it was designed by the Multnomah County Road Department, The drive reaches the summit of Rocky Butte to a viewpoint overlooking Portland. Workers used basalt from the Rocky Butte quarry to create retaining walls, and the finished project was designed to have a rustic style typical for public works projects of the time. WPA workers also built the park and a baroque staircase at the top of Rocky Butte, finishing construction in 1939. At its peak popularity in the 1940s, Rocky Butte had more than 4,000 cars visiting each day. Over time, the park had far fewer visitors and fell into disrepair. During the 1970s, the summit became a frequent site for teenage parties; excessive littering and graffiti were commonplace. In the early 1990s, the Rocky Butte Preservation Society began cleaning up and restoring the park area and adding new amenities. Once  of land were added and the Preservation Society took on an active maintenance role, the site was regraded, original plaques were reinstalled, and lawn areas, irrigation, red cinder walkways and additional trees, flowers, shrubs and grass were added to the park. The District was listed on the National Register of Historic Places in 1991. Other WPA projects included a tunnel  in length at the southern end of Rocky Butte. Built between 1939 and 1941, it was constructed to improve access to scenic views on the Butte. The project took 16 months to complete, and workers used hand mining and drill and shoot methods to excavate layers of cinders and lava flows. The tunnel is curved because of the volcano's 5 degree grade. Rocky Butte basalt was used to build the Rocky Butte Tunnel as well as the nearby West Burnside and NW Cornell Road Tunnels, all of which were constructed by the mason R. Curcio and his crew. In total, the WPA's Rocky Butte project cost $500,000 to complete.

The Hill Military Academy, a prominent military school in Portland, moved from the northwestern district of Portland to a campus on Rocky Butte in 1931. The campus covered  on the northern side of the volcano. Ran by its founder, Joseph Wood Hill, it closed in 1959 after its enrollment had declined significantly, and the school was purchased by Judson Baptist College. Today, Portland Bible College has a campus on Rocky Butte with offices and dormitory buildings, and The Grotto, a famous Catholic shrine encompassing , lies adjacent to the volcano. Created in 1924, The Grotto has more than 200,000 visitors annually. It consists of two levels, which are separated by the  cliff of Rocky Butte's northern face. On the upper level of the shrine is the Chapel of St. Anne, which sits on the northern side of Rocky Butte and offers views of the Columbia River and Mount St. Helens. Built in 1934, the Chapel also has a Peace Garden (finished in 1989) and a Meditation Chapel, which was completed in 1991. The City Bible Church also maintains a location at Rocky Butte, with services on Sunday mornings at 9:30 and 11:15 am as well as youth services on Wednesdays at 7 pm.

In 2000, Portland Police Bureau Officer Mark Kruger placed a shrine to Nazi soldiers on public park property at Rocky Butte. When Kruger's past was discovered during 2003 lawsuits, Kruger removed the shrine. The shrine was stored in the city attorney's office by then-deputy Tracy Reeve, preventing their discovery during the lawsuits. Kruger remained on the force and was promoted to captain in 2009. Kruger admitted to wearing Nazi uniforms. The shrine's existence was discovered by internal affairs in 2010 after commissioner Dan Saltzman ordered an investigation. Kruger was disciplined and suspended for two weeks in 2010, but was not demoted or fired. Kruger continued to state that he was a history buff, not a Nazi. He remained on the force until his retirement.

In May 2018, government officials from the Oregon Department of Transportation began clearing belongings and debris from a long-standing homeless campsite at the eastern side of Rocky Butte, also posting eviction notices. A fire occurred near a homeless camp on the northern side of Rocky Butte in July 2018.

Recreation 

Rocky Butte is part of the Rocky Butte Natural Area, encompassing  of land on NE Rocky Butte Road. The park offers views of the Boring Lava Field, Mount St. Helens, and Mount Hood. It lies in the throat of Rocky Butte's former volcanic vent on a bluff above the Hill Military Academy campus; this land was donated by Joseph Hill's sons. The park has red, crushed stone pathways, a stone wall, and a stone pedestal adorned with a metal plague bearing Joseph Wood Hill's image looking to the west. Rocky Butte is a popular location for seeing mountains. In 2017, the Portland Parks & Recreation bureau proposed to clear trees and invasive species in the park to allow better views of downtown Portland, Mount Hood, and Mount St. Helens, planting 400 low-growth trees and 5,200 shrubs in their place. A man was killed after falling  from the summit viewpoint in May 2015.

Rocky Butte does not have a well-defined trail system. There are a number of climber and biker trails made by civilians on the base and lower parts of the mountain, as well as climbing paths near the summit, which are unfenced and can be unsafe. A walking path described by L. O. Foster (2013) starts from NE 92nd Avenue and Skidmore Street and runs for  each way, lasting 1.5 to 2 hours. This trail passes the Rocky Butte Tunnel,  the site for the Hill Military Academy, and the beacon. Dogs can be unleashed on the trails, but have to be kept on a leash at Joseph Wood Hill Park.

Rocky Butte is also a popular climbing destination in the Portland area, having been developed by climbers during the 1970s and 1980s. Many of its routes are top-roped, but some top anchors are missing from its routes, so daisy chain straps are recommended. The climbing routes are not suitable for dogs or children. Some of the most popular climbs are on the section known as Video Bluff. Rocky Butte provides a variety of climbs including cracks, dihedrals, slab, vertical, and overhanging face routes.

References

Sources 

 
 
 
 
 .
 
 .
 .
 .
 
 .
 
 
 
 .
 .
 .
 .

External links 

 Rocky Butte Preservation Society
 Rocky Butte Scenic Drive Historic District at PortlandMaps
 NRHP Registration Form, 1991
 

Buttes of Oregon
Cascade Volcanoes
Cinder cones of the United States
Geography of Portland, Oregon
Landforms of Multnomah County, Oregon
Madison South, Portland, Oregon
Mountains of Oregon
Parks in Portland, Oregon
Subduction volcanoes
Volcanoes of Multnomah County, Oregon
Volcanoes of Oregon